A sugar refinery is a refinery which processes raw sugar from cane or beets into white refined sugar.

Many cane sugar mills produce raw sugar, which is sugar that still contains molasses, giving it more colour (and impurities) than the white sugar which is normally consumed in households and used as an ingredient in soft drinks and foods. While cane sugar does not need refining to be palatable, sugar from sugar beet is almost always refined to remove the strong, usually unwanted, taste of beets from it. The refined sugar produced is more than 99 percent pure sucrose. 

Many sugar mills only operate during the harvest season, whereas  refineries may work the year round. Sugar beet refineries tend to have shorter periods when they process beet than cane refineries, but may store intermediate product and process it in the off-season. Raw sugar is either processed and sold locally, or is exported and refined elsewhere.

History

Sugar refineries date back to Arab Egypt in the 12th century. 
The British refining industry started in 1544 and was centred in the ports of Glasgow, Liverpool, Bristol and London. The risks involved in large refineries stimulated developments in the insurance industry. There were 16 fires in Greenock refineries between 1859 and 1895. Tate & Lyle became Britain's dominant refining company in the 20th century, but sold  its sugar refining business in 2010 to American Sugar Refining.

Sugar refineries are often located in heavy sugar-consuming regions such as North America, Europe, and Japan. Since the 1990s, many state-of-the art sugar refineries have been built in the Middle East and North Africa region, e.g. in Dubai, Saudi Arabia and Algeria. The world´s largest sugar refinery company is American Sugar Refining with facilities in North America and Europe.

Raw sugar processing

Affination

The raw sugar is stored in large warehouses and then transported into the sugar refinery by means of transport belts. In the traditional refining process, the raw sugar is first mixed with heavy syrup and centrifuged to wash away the outer coating of the raw sugar crystals, which is less pure than the crystal interior. Many sugar refineries today buy high pol sugar and can do without the affination process.

Purification
In the purification step, the juice is mixed with hot milk of lime (a suspension of calcium hydroxide in water). This treatment precipitates a number of impurities, including multivalent anions such as sulfate, phosphate, citrate and oxalate, which precipitate as their calcium salts and large organic molecules such as proteins, saponins and pectins, which aggregate in the presence of multivalent cations. In addition, the alkaline conditions convert the simple sugars, glucose and fructose, along with the amino acid glutamine, to chemically stable carboxylic acids. Left untreated, these sugars and amines would eventually frustrate crystallization of the sucrose.

Carbonatation
In the carbonation step carbon dioxide is bubbled through the alkaline sugar solution, precipitating the lime as calcium carbonate (chalk). The chalk particles entrap some impurities and absorb others. A recycling process builds up the size of chalk particles and a natural flocculation occurs where the heavy particles settle out in tanks (clarifiers). A final addition of more carbon dioxide precipitates more calcium from solution; this is filtered off, leaving a cleaner, golden light-brown sugar solution called "thin juice".

In 1935, the inputs required to process  of beets to sugar was outlined as follows:
  limestone
  coke (to convert limestone to quicklime)
  water

Phosphatation 
Phosphatation is achieved by adding phosphoric acid after adding calcium hydroxide to form calcium phosphate. 

The remaining sugar is then dissolved to make a sugar liquor (about 70 percent by weight solids), which is clarified by the addition of phosphoric acid and calcium hydroxide that combine to precipitate calcium phosphate. The calcium phosphate particles entrap some impurities and absorb others, and then float to the top of the tank, where they are skimmed off.

Decolorization 
After any remaining solids are filtered out, the clarified sugar liquor is decolorized by filtration through the use of bone char, which is made from the bones of cattle, a bed of activated carbon or, in more modern plants, ion-exchange resin.

Evaporation 
The thin juice is concentrated by multiple-effect evaporation to make a "thick juice", roughly 60% sucrose by weight and similar in appearance to maple syrup. It is also sterilised with UV light. Thick juice can be stored in tanks for later processing, reducing the load on the crystallization plant.

Crystallization 

Feeding the thick juice to the crystallizers is the first step of this subprocess. Recycled sugar is dissolved into the juice and the resulting syrup is called mother liquor. The liquor is concentrated further by boiling under a vacuum in large vessels (the so-called vacuum pans) and seeded with fine sugar crystals. These crystals grow as sugar from the mother liquor forms around them.

The massecuite is then passed to a centrifuge, where the High Green syrup is removed from the massecuite by centrifugal force. After a predetermined time, water is then sprayed into the centrifuge through a spray bar to wash the sugar crystals which produces Low Green syrup. The centrifuge then spins at very high speed to partially dry the crystals. The machine then slows down and a plough-shaped arm is deployed which ploughs out the white refined sugar from the sides of the centrifuge from the top to the bottom onto a conveying plant underneath where it is transported into a rotating granulator where it is dried using warm air.

The high green syrup is fed to a raw sugar vacuum pan from which a second batch of sugar is produced. This sugar ("raw") is of lower quality with more color and impurities, and is the main source of the sugar dissolved again into the mother liquor. The syrup from the raw (Low green syrup) is boiled for a long time in AP Pans and sent to slowly flow around a series of about eight crystallizers. From this, a very low-quality sugar crystal is produced (known in some systems as "AP sugar") that is also redisolved. The syrup separated is molasses, which still contains sugar, but contains too much impurity to undergo further processing economically. The molasses is stored on site and is added to dried beet pulp to make animal feed, sold in bulk tankers, fermented to alcohol, or further processed.

Molasses recovery 
Since molasses still contain sugar, it is advantageous to recover it. The Steffen Process was used to recover some, so advanced factories had a "Steffen house" next to the plant. During World War I, when imported potash from European sources was unavailable in the United States, "Steffen's wastewater" provided a good source, leading to a profitable income stream for a factory. The need disappeared immediately after the war. In the 1950s, industrial fermentation advanced to produce monosodium glutamate (MSG), previously produced in Japan by the expensive racemization process. Beet sugar molasses, with a Corynebacterium (especially Corynebacterium glutamicum) and combined with penicillin or a surfactant to block biotin, produced MSG as a result, which effectively produced large profits from what was formerly waste.

Sugar drying and storage 
Granulated sugar is sugar in which the individual sugar grains do not clump together. This is achieved by drying. The sugar is first dried in a hot rotary dryer, and then by blowing cool air through it for several days in conditioning silos. The finished product is stored in large concrete or steel silos. It is shipped in bulk, big bags or  bags to industrial customers or packed in consumer-size packages to retailers.

The dried sugar must be handled with caution, as sugar dust explosions are possible. For example, a sugar dust explosion which led to 13 fatalities was the 2008 Georgia sugar refinery explosion in Port Wentworth, GA.

Byproducts 
Molasses 
Bagasse

Many road authorities in North America use desugared beet molasses as de-icing or anti-icing products in winter control operations. The molasses can be used directly, combined with liquid chlorides and applied to road surfaces, or used to treat the salt spread on roads. Molasses can be more advantageous than road salt alone because it reduces corrosion and lowers the freezing point of the salt-brine mix, so the de-icers remain effective at lower temperatures. Adding the liquid to rock salt also reduces the bounce and scatter of the rock salt, keeping it where it is needed, and reduces the activation time of the salt to begin the melting process.

Factory automation in sugar refineries 
As in many other industries factory automation has been promoted heavily in sugar refineries in recent decades. The production process is generally controlled by a central process control system, which directly controls most of the machines and components. Only for certain special machines such as the centrifuges in the sugar house decentralized PLCs are used for security reasons.

References

Bibliography

External links 

Sugar related online glossary.
Sugar refining.

 
Egyptian inventions
Industrial buildings
Refinery